The K7001/7002 Harbin-Mudanjiang Through Train is a Chinese railway running between Harbin to Mudanjiang. It is an express passenger train by the Harbin Railway Bureau. Harbin passenger segment is responsible for passenger transport task, Harbin originating on the Mudanjiang train. 25T Type Passenger trains running along the Binsui Railway across Heilongjiang provinces, the entire 355 km. Harbin Railway Station to Mudanjiang Railway Station running 4 hours and 13 minutes, use trips for K7001; Mudanjiang Railway Station to Harbin Railway Station to run 4 hours and 13 minutes, use trips for K7002.

See also 
K7047/7048 Harbin-Mudanjiang Through Train

References 

Passenger rail transport in China
Rail transport in Heilongjiang